Afritsch is a surname. Notable people with the surname include:

Anton Afritsch (1873–1924), Austrian journalist and politician
Josef Afritsch (1901–1964), Austrian horticulturalist and politician

German-language surnames